Franklin Foer (born July 20, 1974) is a staff writer at The Atlantic and former editor of The New Republic, commenting on contemporary issues from a liberal perspective.

Personal life 
Foer was born in 1974 to a Jewish family. He is the son of Albert Foer, a lawyer, and Esther Safran Foer. He is the elder brother of novelist Jonathan Safran Foer and freelance journalist Joshua Foer.
He graduated from Columbia University in 1996 and lives in Washington, D.C. with his wife and two daughters.

Career 
Foer has written for Slate and New York magazine. He served as editor of American magazine The New Republic from 2006 until 2010, when he resigned—by his subsequent account, because of exhaustion over an interminable search for a patron who could save the magazine. He then became editor again in 2012, recruited by new patron Chris Hughes. His book How Soccer Explains the World was published in 2004. The book Jewish Jocks, which he co-edited with New Republic writer Marc Tracy, was published in 2012. It won a National Jewish Book Award in 2012. Foer has described it as an effort to avoid the "simple hagiography" he found in some of the many existing books about Jewish sports figures.

Foer was editor of The New Republic during the Scott Thomas Beauchamp controversy.  His firing in December 2014 by New Republic owner Chris Hughes and his replacement by former Gawker editor Gabriel Snyder provoked an editorial crisis that culminated in the resignation from the magazine of two-thirds of the people on its masthead.

In 2017 Foer published World Without Mind: The Existential Threat of Big Tech, which was named a New York Times 100 Notable Books of 2017. Using Facebook, Amazon, Google, and Apple as case studies, World Without Mind argues for a closer examination for the role of technology in our lives, particularly the ways it is shaping the values of individuals globally.

Durring his time as New Republic editor Foer submitted drafts of his articles to Fusion GPS. And in a burst of on-the-nose-ism, he named the file containing one of his drafts "Manchuriancandidate.Foer.”

In October 2022, Foer reported in The Atlantic an in-depth overview of possible legal consequences of activities performed by former president Donald Trump.

Bibliography

Books
 How Soccer Explains the World (2004)
 Jewish Jocks, co-edited with Marc Tracy (2012)
 World Without Mind: The Existential Threat of Big Tech (2017)

Essays and reporting
 
 

Notes

References

External links
Video discussion/debate with Foer and Paul Glastris on Bloggingheads.tv

1974 births
Living people
American magazine editors
American male journalists
American people of Polish-Jewish descent
The Atlantic (magazine) people
Columbia College (New York) alumni
Jewish American writers
The New Republic people
Foer family
Georgetown Day School alumni
21st-century American Jews